{{Drugbox
| Verifiedfields = changed
| verifiedrevid = 477240334
| IUPAC_name = [(2R,3R,4S,6S)-3-Hydroxy-6-[(2R,4S,6S)-4-hydroxy-6-[(2R,3S,4S,6R)-4-hydroxy-6-[ [(5R,8R,9S,10S,13R,14S,17R)-14-hydroxy-10,13-dimethyl-17-(5-oxo-2H-furan-3-yl)-1,2,3,4,5,6,7,8,9,11,12,15,16,17-tetradecahydrocyclopenta[a]phenanthren-3-yl]oxy]-2-methyloxan-3-yl]oxy-2-methyloxan-3-yl]oxy-2-methyloxan-4-yl] acetate
| image = Acetyldigitoxin.png

| tradename =  
| pregnancy_AU = 
| pregnancy_US = 
| pregnancy_category =  
| legal_AU = 
| legal_CA = 
| legal_UK = 
| legal_US = 
| legal_status =  
| routes_of_administration =  

| bioavailability =  
| protein_bound =  
| metabolism =  
| elimination_half-life =  
| excretion =  

| CAS_number_Ref = 
| CAS_number = 1111-39-3
| ATC_prefix = C01
| ATC_suffix = AA01
| PubChem = 68949
| DrugBank_Ref = 
| DrugBank = DB00511
| ChemSpiderID_Ref = 
| ChemSpiderID = 4447572
| UNII_Ref = 
| UNII = 0ZV4Q4L2FU
| KEGG_Ref = 
| KEGG = D06881
| ChEBI_Ref = 
| ChEBI = 53773
| ChEMBL_Ref = 
| ChEMBL = 1200634

| C=43 | H=66 | O=14 
| smiles = O=C\1OC/C(=C/1)[C@H]2CC[C@@]8(O)[C@]2(C)CC[C@H]7[C@H]8CC[C@H]6[C@]7(C)CC[C@H](O[C@@H]5O[C@@H]([C@@H](O[C@@H]4O[C@@H]([C@@H](O[C@@H]3O[C@H](C)[C@@H](O)[C@@H](OC(=O)C)C3)[C@@H](O)C4)C)[C@@H](O)C5)C)C6
| StdInChI_Ref = 
| StdInChI = 1S/C43H66O14/c1-21-38(48)33(54-24(4)44)19-37(51-21)57-40-23(3)53-36(18-32(40)46)56-39-22(2)52-35(17-31(39)45)55-27-9-12-41(5)26(16-27)7-8-30-29(41)10-13-42(6)28(11-14-43(30,42)49)25-15-34(47)50-20-25/h15,21-23,26-33,35-40,45-46,48-49H,7-14,16-20H2,1-6H3/t21-,22-,23-,26-,27+,28-,29+,30-,31+,32+,33+,35+,36+,37+,38-,39-,40-,41+,42-,43+/m1/s1
| StdInChIKey_Ref = 
| StdInChIKey = HPMZBILYSWLILX-UMDUKNJSSA-N
}}Acetyldigitoxin''' is a cardiac glycoside. It is an acetyl derivative of digitoxin, found in the leaves of Digitalis'' species. It is used to treat cardiac failure, particularly that associated with tachycardia.

References 

Cardenolides
Acetate esters